Martin Davis (born 11 October 1996) is a Jamaican footballer who currently plays for Gżira United F.C. in the Maltese Premier League.

Career

College and amateur 
Davis joined Harbour View aged 12, and a year later was awarded a summer scholarship with Spanish club Valencia following his performances at the Nexter Generation Valencia CF Easter Football Camp in Jamaica. He had a two-year orientation with the European club, and it was there he was converted from a forward into a midfielder.

He represented Harbour View in both Junior and Premier Leagues, as well as the Manning Cup at St. George's College during high school. However, he was forced to miss the entire 2014 season due to injury.

He also played for Caxton College and Sagunto FC during his youth career. Davis had a month-long trial with Toronto FC in July 2014, and was subsequently offered a place in the youth development programme.

Professional 
Joining the Toronto FC Academy in January 2015, Davis featured for Toronto FC III fourteen times, scoring four times in the 2015 PDL season and appeared for Toronto FC II twice during the 2015 USL season. He made his debut for the reserve team on 28 March 2015 against FC Montreal, before making his first professional start on 19 April 2015 against Whitecaps FC 2.

The club announced that Davis had been rewarded with a USL contract in February 2016, which would see him remain with Toronto FC II for the 2016 season.

In September 2017, Davis signed with St. Andrews F.C. in Malta on an initial loan deal before signing for the club on a permanent basis in 2018. In November 2018, Davis won the BOV Player of the Month award after impressing in a 2-0 win over Balzan F.C.

In August 2019, Davis signed a 5 year contract with Gżira United F.C.

International 
Davis has represented Jamaica at under-17 and under-20 levels. On 12 July 2012, he made his debut in a 5-0 win against Bermuda in the CONCACAF U-17 Championship. He made three further appearances for the U17s in a 1-1 draw against Panama, a 2–2 draw with Barbados and a 4-2 defeat to Canada. In January 2015, he made his debut in the CONCACAF U-20 Championship during a 2-2 draw with Trinidad & Tobago.

He is eligible to represent both Jamaica and Canada, due to his father being Canadian. As a result of holding a Canadian passport, Davis would classify as a domestic player for Toronto FC in both MLS and USL Pro.

References 

1996 births
Living people
Jamaican footballers
Jamaica youth international footballers
Jamaican expatriate footballers
Association football forwards
Toronto FC players
Toronto FC II players
Harbour View F.C. players
St. Andrews F.C. players
Gżira United F.C. players
Maltese Premier League players
USL Championship players
2015 CONCACAF U-20 Championship players
Jamaica under-20 international footballers
Jamaican expatriate sportspeople in the United States
Jamaican expatriate sportspeople in Canada
Jamaican expatriate sportspeople in Malta
Expatriate footballers in Malta
Expatriate soccer players in the United States
Expatriate soccer players in Canada